Myurella okudai is a species of sea snail, a marine gastropod mollusk in the family Terebridae.

Original description
        Poppe G.T., Tagaro S.P. & Goto Y. (2018). New marine species from the Central Philippines. Visaya. 5(1): 91–135.
page(s): 110, pl. 12 figs 1–2.

References

External links
 Worms Link

Terebridae